Sir Alan Edward Percival Rose  was a British barrister and colonial judge.

Early life and education
Rose was born in London, the son of author Charles Edward Rose. He was educated at Aldenham School and Trinity College, Cambridge. He served in the 1st Battalion Rifle Brigade of the British Army in World War I. He was called to the bar in 1923.

Career
Rose served in the Colonial Legal Service from 1929 to 1942 in Fiji, Rhodesia and Palestine. After serving as Solicitor General of British Palestine, Rose became Commissioner in charge of investigating corruption in the Customs Department in 1942 before serving in Ceylon until 1955. He was appointed to the Supreme Court of Ceylon in 1945, served as Legal Secretary in 1946–47 and Attorney General of Ceylon from 1947 to 1951, before being appointed the 30th Chief Justice of Ceylon. He was appointed in 1952 succeeding Edward Jayetileke and was Chief Justice until 1956. He was succeeded by Hema Henry Basnayake.

He initially retired following his appointment in Ceylon, but stayed active. In 1956, he chaired the Commission of Enquiry into the affairs of Nairobi City Council. In 1958, on the strength of his service in Ceylon, he was chosen as Chief Justice of Singapore and served during the period of time in which the colony achieved self governance.

Rose was knighted in 1950 and created a Knight Commander of the Order of St Michael and St George in 1955. He finally retired in 1963.

Rose returned to England and died in Brighton in 1975.

References

1899 births
1975 deaths
English Jews
Alumni of Trinity College, Cambridge
People educated at Aldenham School
Members of the Inner Temple
Knights Bachelor
Chief justices of Sri Lanka
20th-century British people
People from British Ceylon
Chief justices of Singapore
Knights Commander of the Order of St Michael and St George
Ceylonese Queen's Counsel
Colonial Legal Service officers